Khulta Kali Khulena is an Indian Marathi language TV series which aired on Zee Marathi. It starred Omprakash Shinde, Mayuri Deshmukh and Abhidnya Bhave in lead roles.

Plot 
Dr. Vikrant Dalvi, who is a renowned gynaecologist by profession, is set to tie the knot with Monika. Vikrant hails from a renowned family of doctors by profession while Monika and her sister Manasi lost their parents while they were kids. They have been raised by their paternal grandparents. Vikrant loved Monika while she married him for the sake of hiding her dirty secret from his family. On the wedding day, Vikrant learns that Monika is nearly three months pregnant and soon reveals it to Manasi but both keep the truth hidden for the sake of Monika and Manasi's aged grandparents. Later Vikrant confronts Monika, but she denied her affair and considers it as a mistake.

Soon, Manasi joins Vikrant's hospital as a pediatrician and later become best friends. Monika gets insecure of their friendship and confronts them. Vikrant and Manasi backfires Monika's attempt. Later she tries to make hurdles for them. Vikrant learns of this conspiracy and files a divorce. By now, the Dalvi family learns about Monika's pregnancy and she claims that the unborn child's father is Vikrant. The family earlier turns cold by this revelation, however gets well with them with for the sake of unborn child.

Later, Vikrant learns that the Monika was aware about her pregnancy before her marriage. Hence, Vikrant confronts her in front of whole family. By this shocking stance of Vikrant, entire family helps Vikrant divorce Monika, but she warms the family with threat of the child. Manasi starts dating Salil Pandit on her grandparents' wishes. But she is always connected and concerned about Vikrant and the unborn child. During a court hearing, Monika collapses and goes into labour pain. Post 48 hours of surgery, a daughter is born and later named Isha. Due to troubles caused by Monika and Isha, Manasi shifts to Delhi with Isha.

4 years later
Later, Isha and Manasi return to Mumbai. Monika who lives with Vikrant for her lifestyle, gets insecure because of Isha and Manasi. Later when Vikrant tries to divorce her, she uses Isha as pawn against Vikrant. Also, Salil confesses Manasi about her attachment to Vikrant and Isha. Monika's ex-boyfriend and Isha's biological father Rajan returns, and frauds Monika leaving her on the road. Later Vikrant and Manasi express their love for each other but decide not to marry for Isha's will.

Cast

Main 
 Mayuri Deshmukh as Dr. Manasi Shashikant Deshpande
 Omprakash Shinde as Dr. Vikrant Vijay Dalvi
 Abhidnya Bhave as Monika Vikrant Dalvi / Monika Shashikant Deshpande

Recurring 
 Usha Nadkarni as Parvati Sadashiv Dalvi (Vikrant's grandmother)
 Savita Prabhune as Alka Vijay Dalvi (Vikrant's mother)
 Sanjay Mone as Vijay Sadashiv Dalvi (Vikrant's father)
 Lokesh Gupte as Mohan Sadashiv Dalvi (Vikrant's uncle)
 Mangesh Salvi replaced Lokesh
 Sharvari Lohokare as Geeta Mohan Dalvi (Vikrant's aunt)
 Sharvani Pillai replaced Sharvari
 Manasi Magikar as Manasi and Monika's paternal grandmother
 Arun Mohare as Manasi and Monika's paternal grandfather
 Asha Shelar as Dr. Nirmala Sadashiv Dalvi (Vikrant's aunt)
 Rutuja Dharmadhikari as Richa (Monika's friend) 
 Sankarshan Karhade as Salil Pandit (Manasi's fiance) 
 Sunil Godbole as Nanu Aajoba, Parvati's younger brother.
 Sharvari Patankar as Sai, Deshpande's paying guest.
 Seema Ghogale as Bakula (Bucks), Monika's personal maid.
 Niranjan Namjoshi as Rajan Sawant (Monika's boyfriend / Isha's biological father)

Reception 
The series premiered from 18 July 2016 by replacing Majhe Pati Saubhagyawati.

Special episode (1 hour) 
 21 August 2016
 25 December 2016

Ratings

Awards

References

External links 
 Khulta Kali Khulena at ZEE5
 

Marathi-language television shows
Zee Marathi original programming
2016 Indian television series endings
2017 Indian television series debuts